"Gong Xi Gong Xi" is a popular Mandarin Chinese song and a Chinese Lunar New Year standard.  Other English titles for the song include "Congratulations" and "Happiness To You".

History 

The music and words of the song are both by Chen Gexin (under the pen name Qing Yu). It was written in Shanghai in 1945 to celebrate the defeat of Japan and liberation of China at the end of the Second Sino-Japanese War (World War II).  The final lines of this song replicate the typical beat of the Chinese drum.  An early popular recording of the song was by Yao Lee and her brother Yao Min.

Because its Mandarin title is also a common Lunar New Year greeting and the song celebrates the arrival of spring, it quickly became associated almost exclusively with New Year celebrations and remains a part of the season's musical canon.  Contemporary versions of the song frequently appear on Chinese New Year musical collection albums, sometimes as electronic dance music performances and occasionally also feature lyrics in Taiwanese Hokkien and even English.

A more modern rendition of the song appeared on the 2002 China Dolls album 多一點點 – 小調大風行. This song was included in the Pink Martini Christmas album Joy to the World released in 2010, under the title "Congratulations - A Happy New Year Song" with vocals by China Forbes and Timothy Yuji Nishimoto. Khởi My sung a Vietnamese adaptation called Chúc Tết.

Lyrics

See also
Chinese New Year
Music of China

References

External links
https://www.youtube.com/watch?v=IcMGcT6gByM A rendition of the song in YouTube

Chinese songs
Chinese patriotic songs
Mandarin-language songs
1945 songs
1945 compositions